Eric Carl Peter Andersen (2 July 1904 – 20 January 1997) was an Australian rules footballer who played with Melbourne and Footscray in the Victorian Football League (VFL).

Notes

External links 

1904 births
1997 deaths
Australian rules footballers from Melbourne
Melbourne Football Club players
Western Bulldogs players
People from Prahran, Victoria